The Mauritius International is an annual feature international badminton tournament held in Mauritius organized by Mauritius Badminton Association (MBA) and sanctioned by BWF. The tournament for most part and in recent years has been an International Series rated event, but in 2012 and 2013, rated as Future Series event. Another tournament, Rose-Hill International established in 2016 rated as Future Series event.

Previous winners

Performances by nation

References

External links
Tournamentsoftware.com

Badminton in Mauritius
Sports competitions in Mauritius
Badminton tournaments in Mauritius